Dahe Daily is a Chinese newspaper based in Zhengzhou, Henan, established on August 1, 1995 by the Henan Daily Newspaper Group. Its daily circulation was 600,000 in 2003, ranking 16th in China and 99th in the world, and reached one million in 2006.

References

External links

Mass media in Zhengzhou
Daily newspapers published in China
Publications established in 1995
1995 establishments in China